Quézac is a French commune in the department of Cantal, located in the south-eastern region of Auvergne-Rhône-Alpes

Population

History 
During the 10th century, it was the seat of a Benedictine abbey.

See also
Communes of the Cantal department

References

Communes of Cantal